Epp is predominantly an Estonian feminine given name. As of 1 January 2021, 671 women in Estonia have the first name Epp, making it the 248th most popular female name in the country. The name is most commonly found in Põlva County. Individuals bearing the name Epp include:

 Epp Annus (born 1969), Estonian writer and literary scholar
 Epp Eespäev (born 1961), Estonian actress
 Epp Haabsaar (born 1953), Estonian judge, politician and artist
 Epp Kaidu (1915–1976), Estonian theatre director and actress
 Epp Mäe (born 1992), Estonian freestyle, judo and sumo wrestler
 Epp Mikkal (:et:Epp Mikkal) (born 1942), Estonian playwright and theatre pedagogue
 Epp Petrone (born 1974), Estonian journalist, blogger, children's writer and publisher
 Epp Tamm (:et:Epp Tamm) (1940–2020), Estonian classical linguist and translator

References

Feminine given names
Estonian feminine given names